The Indiana Hoosiers are the intercollegiate sports teams and players of Indiana University Bloomington, named after the colloquial term for people from the state of Indiana. The Hoosiers participate in Division I of the National Collegiate Athletic Association (NCAA) in 24 sports and became a member of the Big Ten Conference on December 1, 1899. The school's official colors are cream and crimson.

The Indiana Hoosiers have won 24 NCAA national championships and one Association for Intercollegiate Athletics for Women (AIAW) national championship, in addition to 145 NCAA individual national championships. Titles won by teams include eight by the Hoosiers men's soccer team, a record-setting six straight in men's swimming and diving, five by the Hoosiers men's basketball team, three in men's cross country, one in men's track and field and one in wrestling.

The Hoosiers' athletic program is perhaps best known for its basketball program, with its five NCAA Championships tying for fourth in history. Indiana's 1976 squad remains the last undefeated NCAA men's basketball champion. A 2018 study listed Indiana as the second most valuable collegiate basketball program in the country. Additionally, Hoosiers' athletics is well known for its soccer program; by a number of indicators, it is one of the greatest college soccer programs in the history of the sport. Since the program began in 1973, Indiana owns more National Championships, more wins, has appeared in more College Cups (18) and has a higher winning percentage in both regular season and post-season play than any other school in Division I soccer.

Indiana has two main rivalries including in-state, with the Purdue Boilermakers (see Indiana–Purdue rivalry), and a border rivalry against the Kentucky Wildcats (see Indiana–Kentucky rivalry).

Traditions

School colors

The school's official colors are cream and crimson. The official IU Crimson is Pantone 201.  However, in the 1970s former basketball coach Bob Knight and football coach Lee Corso started using uniforms that were more scarlet or bright red. During the same time, cream gave way almost universally to white. But those colors reverted mostly to cream and crimson in the early 2000s, after then-athletics director Michael McNeely decided that the team uniforms needed to reflect the school's official colors of cream and crimson. Indiana cheerleaders still chant "Go Big Red". The changes over the years has led to some clashing of colors in some varsity sport uniforms, as is the case with the baseball team's jackets being a different color than their caps and uniforms. Athletic Director Fred Glass said, "My view is that we're an awfully big and diverse place. I think cream and crimson and 'Go Big Red' can survive in one place." Only four other major college programs claim crimson as their dominant color: Alabama, Harvard, Oklahoma and Washington State, and only Oklahoma pairs crimson with cream.

Mascot
The school does not have a mascot, but student-athletes are known as "Hoosiers", a nickname for natives or residents of Indiana. A bulldog named Ox served as the football team's mascot from 1959 to 1965. Indiana had a bison as its mascot in the late 1960s and introduced a mascot named "Hoosier Pride" in 1979. The mascot didn't go over well with fans and was quickly abandoned.

School songs
The Indiana Hoosiers have two fight songs – "Indiana, Our Indiana" and "Indiana Fight!" – along with an alma mater song, "Hail to Old IU". Indiana's most recognized fight song, "Indiana, Our Indiana", was first performed by the IU Band in November 1912 at a football game against Northwestern. The song has since been played at every Indiana football and basketball game. Indiana's popular fight song melody is "Indiana Fight!", though the words are rarely sung at an Indiana sporting event. The crowd usually just sings "GO! IU! FIGHT! FIGHT! FIGHT! Indiana, we're all for you!" at the end of the song. Indiana's official Alma Mater song, "Hail to Old IU" was first performed on March 10, 1893, in Indianapolis. J.T. Giles, who organized the IU glee club wrote the words to a Scottish song in order to give the Hoosiers a school song for a performance at a state contest. The song has been a mainstay at Indiana events since that day. An additional school song, "Chimes of Indiana," was written by alumnus Hoagy Carmichael (Class of 1925-law degree 1926), and was presented to the university in 1937 as a gift from the class of 1935.

Sports sponsored

Baseball 

The Hoosiers have appeared eight times in the NCAA Tournament, in 1996, 2009, 2013, 2014, 2015, 2017, 2018 and 2019 including one College World Series appearance. They have won the regular season conference championship seven times – 1925, 1932, 1938, 1949, 2013, 2014 and 2019. The current head baseball coach of the Hoosiers is Jeff Mercer. Beginning in 2013, the Hoosiers play in Bart Kaufman Field.

Basketball

Men's basketball 

The Indiana Hoosiers men's basketball team is the intercollegiate men's basketball program representing Indiana University. The Hoosiers play on Branch McCracken Court at Simon Skjodt Assembly Hall on the IU campus. Indiana has won five NCAA Championships in men's basketball (1940, 1953, 1976, 1981, 1987) — the first two under coach Branch McCracken and the latter three under Bob Knight. The Hoosiers' five NCAA Championships are tied for fourth with Duke (5), trailing North Carolina (6), UCLA (11), and Kentucky (8). Indiana's 1976 squad remains the last undefeated NCAA men's basketball champion.

The Hoosiers are also sixth in NCAA Tournament appearances (36), sixth in NCAA Tournament victories (62), seventh in Final Four appearances (8), and 11th in overall victories (1,665). The Hoosiers have won 22 Big Ten Conference Championships and have the best winning percentage in conference games at nearly 60 percent. No team has had more All-Big Ten selections than the Hoosiers with 53. The Hoosiers also rank seventh in all-time AP poll appearances and sixth in number of weeks spent at No 1. Every four-year men's basketball letterman since 1973 has earned a trip to the NCAA basketball tournament. Additionally, every four-year player since 1950 has played on a nationally ranked squad at Indiana.

A 2012 study listed Indiana as the third most valuable collegiate basketball program in the country.  Indiana has ranked in the top 15 nationally in men's basketball attendance every season since Assembly Hall opened in 1972, and often in the top five. When asked if Indiana basketball fans were the most passionate in the country, ESPN commentator Dick Vitale said, "I don't think there's any doubt about it. They eat, sleep and drink the game." Basketball sportscaster Gus Johnson called Assembly Hall, "the Carnegie Hall of basketball."

Indiana has intense rivalries both in-state, against the Purdue Boilermakers (see Indiana–Purdue rivalry), and out-of-state, against the Kentucky Wildcats (see Indiana–Kentucky rivalry). The team is currently coached by Mike Woodson.

Women's basketball 

Women's basketball began as a varsity sport in the 1971–72 season. The Hoosiers were co-Big Ten champions the 1982–83 season, won the Big Ten Tournament in the 2001–02 season, and won the WNIT in the 2017–18 season. The current head coach of the Hoosiers is Teri Moren.

Football 

Indiana began playing football in 1884 and currently plays in the 52,656-seat, open-air Memorial Stadium, built in 1960. The current head football coach of the Hoosiers is Tom Allen. The team has won the Big Ten Championship twice, once in 1945 and again in 1967. It has appeared in twelve bowl games, including the 1968 Rose Bowl:
1968 Rose Bowl: Lost to the University of Southern California 14–3.
1979 Holiday Bowl: Defeated Brigham Young University 38–37.
1986 All-American Bowl: Lost to Florida State University 27–13.
1987 Peach Bowl: Lost to the University of Tennessee 27–22.
1988 Liberty Bowl: Defeated South Carolina 34–10.
1990 Peach Bowl: Lost to Auburn University 27–23.
1991 Copper Bowl: Defeated Baylor University 24–0.
1993 Independence Bowl: Lost to Virginia Tech 45–20.
2007 Insight Bowl: Lost to Oklahoma State University 49–33.
2015 Pinstripe Bowl: Lost to Duke University 44-41OT
2016 Foster Farms Bowl: Lost to University of Utah 26–24.
2020 Gator Bowl: Lost to University of Tennessee 23–22.
2021 Outback Bowl: Lost to Ole Miss 26–20.

Soccer

Men's soccer 

By a number of indicators, the Hoosiers are one of the greatest soccer programs in the history of the sport. The Hoosiers have won eight national championships in men's soccer (1982, 1983, 1988, 1998, 1999, 2003, 2004 and 2012), second only to St. Louis' 10. Indiana owns more wins, has appeared in more College Cups (22) and has a higher winning percentage in both regular season and post-season play than any other school in Division I soccer.

The Hoosiers have also dominated conference play. Since the Big Ten began sponsoring men's soccer in 1991, Indiana has won 11 Big Ten tournament titles. Indiana has also been crowned regular season champion 14 times, including nine-straight seasons from 1996 to 2004. A league-record 11 Big Ten Players of the Year come from Indiana.

Indiana players have won six Hermann Trophies (including Ken Snow twice) and three Missouri Athletic Club Player of the Year awards. The Hoosiers have produced 13 United States men's national soccer team players, six Olympians and six World Cup players. In addition, Hoosier players have earned All-America honors 52 times.

Every year since the NCAA began tracking men's soccer attendance in 2001, the IU program has ranked among the top three in average or total attendance. Indiana led the nation in average attendance in 2004 and 2005 and in total attendance in 2003. The Hoosiers are currently coached by Todd Yeagley, the son of former Indiana Hall of Fame coach Jerry Yeagley.

Women's soccer 
On November 18, 2007, the Hoosiers defeated Purdue University in the NCAA second round to advance to the NCAA third round for the first time in program history.

Three Indiana Hoosiers played during the inaugural WUSA season: Wendy Dillinger (Atlanta Beat), Tracy Grose (Carolina Courage), and Kelly Wilson (Bay Area CyberRays).

Softball 

The Hoosier softball team has appeared in four Women's College World Series, in 1979, 1980, 1983 and 1986. The current head softball coach of the Hoosiers is Shonda Stanton.

Swimming and diving 

Both the Hoosier men's and women's teams compete at the Counsilman-Billingsley Center in the Student Recreational Sports Center, a  aquatics center. It features an eight-lane Olympic-sized pool spanning  with depth ranging from seven to eight feet to allow for greater speed. The Billingsley Diving Center, complete with one of the country's few indoor diving towers, features four one-meter and two three-meter springboards as well as one-, three-, five-, seven- and 10-meter platforms. The Indiana University Outdoor Pool serves as the team's training facility in the summer months.  It features a ten-lane Olympic-sized pool along with a diving pool that includes a 10-meter platform.

Men's swimming and diving 
The Hoosiers won six straight NCAA national championships from 1968 to 1973, giving them the fifth-most in NCAA history. Their 24 Big Ten crowns, including every Big Ten championship from 1961 to 1985, rank second in the conference's 90-year history. Indiana has produced 80 individual swimming and diving national champions, over 191 Big Ten swimming champions, 25 conference diving champions and has won 45 Big Ten relay events. The 80 national champions ranks third among Big Ten schools while the individual Big Ten diving, relay and individual swimming crowns all rank second among all conference schools. The success goes well beyond the Big Ten and the NCAA Championship as is evidenced by the eight straight U.S. National Diving Championships that Indiana divers have won.

Under former coaches James Counsilman and Hobie Billingsley, the men's swimming and diving program won 140 consecutive dual meets, 20 consecutive Big Ten titles and an NCAA Division I record six consecutive NCAA Championships (1968–1973), most of which were won under swimming great Mark Spitz. A writer for Sports Illustrated in the early 1970s said, "a good case can be made for the 1971 Indiana swimming team being the best college team ever—in any sport."

Women's swimming and diving 
The Hoosiers have produced 4 individual national champions and six Big Ten championship teams in 2003, 2007, 2009, 2010, 2011 and 2019. Fourteen Hoosier women count themselves as Olympians, winning six medals in all.

Cross country

Men's cross country 

Men's cross country began on the Indiana campus in 1910. Since the inception of cross country as an NCAA sport, Indiana is one of only nine schools in the nation to have won more than two men's national titles, and is one of seven programs to win at least three national titles. The school's three team national titles came in 1938, 1940, and 1942. Indiana's 29 NCAA men's championship team appearances are tied for ninth-most in the sport's history. Indiana has found itself in the top five at the NCAA Men's Championship on nine occasions. A Hoosier has captured the men's individual crown three times, making Indiana one of only six schools in the country, and the only Big Ten school, to have more than two individual NCAA men's cross country champions. The three individual titles rank as the fourth-most by any school. Bob Kennedy, regarded as one of the greatest U.S. distance runners in history, graduated from the program in 1992.

Women's cross country 
Women's cross country began in Bloomington in 1978. The NCAA began sponsoring the sport in 1981. The women have had a pair of
individual national champions, something only three other schools in the nation, and just one other in the Big Ten, can claim. On four occasions, the Hoosiers have competed for the NCAA crown as a team (1988, 1989, 1990, 2002). The 1988 season saw Indiana winning an individual men's and women's national cross country championship, a feat that had never happened before in the sport, and has never happened since.

Wrestling 

The Indiana Hoosiers Wrestling began in 1909, with accomplishments such as: 50 individual All-Americans, 12 individual NCAA National Champions from 1932 to 2008, and 1 team NCAA National title in 1932. In 1946 Indiana took 2nd in the Big Ten Championships and 4th in the NCAA Championships. In recent years better seasons included the 1989–1990 season placed 2nd in the Big Ten Conference and 8th at the NCAA Championships, and the 2004–2005 season took 5th place at the Big Ten Conference and 9th at the NCAA Championships.

Duane Goldman was head coach until he retired after the 2017–18 season after 26 years. In his four years as a Hawkeye, Goldman accumulated a 132–10 career record, won four Big Ten Championships and finished as a four-time NCAA All-American. After three consecutive second-place finishes, he won the NCAA Championships in his final season at 190 pounds. The Hoosiers have seen a tremendous amount of success during Goldman's tenure when he took the team to a top ten finish in the NCAA tournament in 2005. On September 5, 2009, Goldman was officially inducted into the University of Iowa Athletics Hall of Fame. During his tenure, Goldman coached Joe Dubuque (2005, 2006) and Angel Escobedo (2008) to national championships. Escobedo was named as Goldman's replacement in April 2018.

The Wrestling team hosts most of their home matches in the 2,000-seat University Gymnasium. The Wrestling team practices in Assembly Hall but prefers the home court advantage of the more intimate University Gymnasium, also known as Intercollegiate Athletics Gym.

Club sports

The Indiana University Club Sports Federation operates separately from the IU Athletic Department, which means that nearly all of the funding for club sports programs comes through organization dues and outside fundraising.  Of the 40 club sports on the Bloomington campus, several are noteworthy for representing IU in high-level national competitions.

Men's ice hockey
The Indiana University men's ice hockey team was founded in 1967, and has played in the American Collegiate Hockey Association Division II Tri-State Collegiate Hockey League since 2019. In February 2022, the Hoosiers claimed their first TSCHL Playoff Championship, after finishing the regular season as runners-up. Previously, they were members of the Central States Collegiate Hockey League conference, which is part of the ACHA Division I.  The team plays most games at the historic Frank Southern Ice Arena off-campus, but some fall practices and games are hosted by the Hamilton Ice Center in Columbus, IN due to seasonal maintenance concerns at "The Frank".

The team holds the 1971 and 2001 Big Ten Hockey League championships, 8 Midwestern Collegiate Hockey League (MCHL) championships during the 1980s and 1990s, and the 2002 Great Midwest Hockey League (GMHL). The Hoosiers men's ice hockey team was the National Championship runner-up in the 1995, 1998, 2000, and 2008 ACHA DII National Championships. The team will compete in the 2022 ACHA Nationals Tournament, being held in St. Louis, MO. Home and road games are broadcast live on the team's Youtube Channel, although the IU Media School's student-run radio station WIUX (formerly WIUS) broadcast select games prior to 2005. The team is led by Head Coach Andrew Weiss, who took over during the 2021–22 season.

Men's rugby
The IU Men's Rugby Club competes in the Big Ten Universities conference, which is part of D1A Rugby – USA Rugby's elite division of college rugby. The Hoosiers finished the 2016–17 season ranked #7.

The club was founded in 1962 and played its first game against the Notre Dame Rugby Football Club. Head Coach Sarasopa Enari arrived to the program in 1994 and has led the team to many notable achievements.

IU reached its first national semifinal in 1998. In 2011 they finished the season ranked 11th. In 2013, IU won the Big Ten Championship match 58–38 over Michigan. In 2015, Indiana defeated Ohio State 34–14 to win another BTU Championship game.  Following the conference championship victory, IU achieved a milestone 38–34 win over Kutztown University in the ACRC Bowl Series. This capped a perfect 12-0 Fall 2015 campaign. The Hoosiers finished the season ranked 5th in the country in the D1A rankings. In the 2016-17 IU won another Big Ten Rugby Championship and fell to 4-time national champions BYU in a D1A quarterfinal.

Indiana has also been successful in rugby sevens, particularly in the Collegiate Rugby Championship, a tournament broadcast live by NBC every June from Subaru Park in the Philadelphia metropolitan area. Indiana has competed in the CRC on 4 occasions since 2010.  IU finished tied for 5th overall in 2015 after going 3–0 in pool play. The pool play victory over Clemson was the first IU Rugby game played on national television (NBCSN).  In 2017 the Hoosiers reached the CRC semifinal before losing to 5-time champions Cal 29–14.

The IU Men's Rugby Club has been hailed as the top "true club rugby team" in the country for its victories over programs who offer scholarships or benefit from their athletic departments, including Kutztown, Life, Davenport, and Notre Dame.

Women's rugby
The IU Women's Rugby Club was founded in 1996, and has also represented Indiana University at a high level.  In 2014, IU reached the national semifinals of the USA Rugby Women's Collegiate Championship.

Women's ice hockey
Despite having a men's ice hockey team since the late 1960s, the women's team was founded in 2019, and began playing during the 2021–22 season. Their inaugural game was a road trip to the University of Illinois at Urbana-Champagne in February, with a full schedule planned for next season. The team plays their home games at the Frank Southern Ice Arena, south of campus in Bloomington.

Men's lacrosse
The men's lacrosse team competes in the Men's Collegiate Lacrosse Association (MCLA) Division 1.  The Hoosiers are a part of the Upper Midwest Lacrosse Conference (UMLC) and compete with Miami Ohio, Michigan State, Purdue, Western Michigan, Illinois, Iowa State, Minnesota, and Nebraska. The Hoosiers previously competed in the Great Rivers Lacrosse Conference (GRLC), and in 2013 were regular season champions for the GRLC D1 East.  They finished the season 11–4 with their final loss of the season in the 2013 GRLC Championship game. In 2014, they finished the season 10-4 and won the GRLC conference championship 14-6 against Illinois State, earning a bid to the MCLA tournament, where they lost 18-5 in the first round to top ranked ASU. In 2018, they finished the season 10-3 and went to the conference championship, beating Purdue 8-5, again earning them a bid to the MCLA tournament, where they lost in the first round 12-6 to first ranked Chapman.

Rivalries
Purdue

The Hoosiers' biggest traditional rival is the Purdue Boilermakers.  The West Lafayette (Purdue) and Bloomington (IU) campuses are the largest in the state of Indiana and are the flagship campuses of the Purdue University and Indiana University systems, respectively. IU and Purdue have competed for the Old Oaken Bucket in football since 1925, a series which Purdue leads 70–36–6. In basketball, IU's 22 Big Ten Championships are second only to Purdue's 24. The Boilermakers also lead the men's basketball series 115–89. Since the 2001–02 year, IU and Purdue have also competed for an all-sports trophy called the Crimson and Gold Cup. IU leads the series 7–6–2.

Kentucky

IU also has a heated border rivalry with the Kentucky Wildcats.  The annual basketball game between the two often carries national significance as they have combined for 13 national championships.  Since 1991, the game has rotated between neutral sites in Indianapolis and Louisville.  This neutrality ended during 2006 when the game was played at Rupp Arena in Lexington, Kentucky, with the 2007 game played at Assembly Hall in Bloomington, Indiana.  Basketball games between the Hoosiers and Wildcats have at times drawn over 30,000 fans. Although the two teams had played every season since 1969, a dispute over whether future games should be played at the schools' respective home courts or at nearby neutral sites led to the cancellation of the game for the 2012–13 season.

Illinois

After Purdue, one of the Hoosiers' biggest conference rivals are the Illinois Fighting Illini. The rivalry is particularly strong with the Illinois basketball team. The all-time series is currently tied at 85–85, the closest series in the Big Ten. The rivalry has lasted through the ages, from Lou Henson and Bob Knight publicly feuding, to Kelvin Sampson and Bruce Weber's heated interaction in recent years.

Michigan State

Indiana has a rivalry with Michigan State Spartans which started in 1950. They battle for the Old Brass Spittoon in football. Michigan State is leading 40–13–1 with Indiana snapping Michigan State's two-year winning streak in 2020.

Little 500 Bike Race

What began as one man's idea Big Young of a bicycle race to raise scholarship money has become an annual IU springtime tradition. The Little 500, which was first held in 1951, inspired the 1979 Academy Award-winning film Breaking Away. Sports Illustrated and USA Today have featured the race in their pages, and it has been covered on national television by CBS, ESPN, Fox Sports, the Outdoor Life Channel, and live in high-definition television by HDNet. Seven-time Tour de France champion Lance Armstrong called the Little 500, which has raised more than $1 million in scholarship money, "the coolest event I ever attended."

In March 2020 the Little 500 race was cancelled for the first time in its history due to the COVID-19 pandemic.

Olympic participation
Between the Los Angeles 1932 games and the Athens 2004 games at least one former alumnus medaled at every Summer Olympics. In world record times, Mark Spitz captured seven swimming gold medals in at the 1972 Summer Olympics in Munich. Following the Rio games, at least 223 IU athletes have competed in the Summer Olympics, of these are representatives of 25 nations. On twelve occasions, Olympic coaches have come from Indiana University. In total, the IU medal count is 104, which include 55 gold, 17 silver and 32 bronze.

Championships

NCAA team championships 
Indiana has won 24 NCAA team national championships.

Men's (24)
Basketball (5): 1940, 1953, 1976, 1981, 1987 
Cross Country (3): 1938, 1940, 1942
Outdoor Track & Field (1): 1932
Soccer (8): 1982, 1983, 1988, 1998, 1999, 2003, 2004, 2012
Swimming (6): 1968, 1969, 1970, 1971, 1972, 1973
Wrestling (1): 1932
See also: 
List of NCAA schools with the most NCAA Division I championships
Big Ten Conference NCAA national team championships

Other national team championships 
One varsity national team championship was not bestowed by the NCAA:

Women's
Tennis (AIAW): 1982
Basketball (WNIT): 2018
Cheerleading Program (6)
Universal Cheerleaders Association National Champions - All Girl Division 1A: 2012, 2013, 2014, 2016, 2017, 2019
See also: 
List of Big Ten Conference National Championships 
List of NCAA schools with the most Division I national championships

National individual championships 

Indiana University has 163 NCAA individual championships.

Men's Swimming & Diving (90)
Men's Outdoor Track & Field (24)
Women's Swimming & Diving (16)
Men's Indoor Track & Field (12)
Wrestling (11)
Men's Cross Country (3)
Women's Cross Country (2)
Women's Indoor Track & Field (2)
Women's Outdoor Track & Field (2)
Men's Gymnastics (1)

Big Ten regular season championships

Indiana University has 183 Big Ten regular season championships.

Men's Swimming & Diving (29): 1961 • 1962 • 1963 • 1964 • 1965 • 1966 • 1967 • 1968 • 1969 • 1970 • 1971 • 1972 • 1973 • 1974 • 1975 • 1976 • 1977 • 1978 • 1979 • 1980 • 1983 • 1984 • 1985 • 2006 • 2017 • 2018 • 2019 • 2022 • 2023
Men's Basketball (22): 1926(co) • 1928(co) • 1936(co) • 1953 • 1954 • 1957(co) • 1958 • 1967 • 1973 • 1974 • 1975 • 1976 • 1980 • 1981 • 1983 • 1987(co) • 1989 • 1991(co) • 1993 • 2002(co) • 2013 • 2016
Men's Indoor Track & Field (18): 1932 • 1933 • 1941 • 1957 • 1973 • 1974 • 1975 • 1979 • 1980 • 1983 • 1984 • 1985 • 1990 • 1991 • 1992 • 2012 • 2017 • 2020
Men's Soccer (17): 1993 • 1994 • 1996 • 1997 • 1998 • 1999 • 2000 • 2001 • 2002 • 2003 • 2004 • 2006 • 2007 • 2010 • 2018 • 2019 • 2021
Men's Cross Country (14): 1928 • 1929 • 1930 • 1931 • 1932 • 1938 • 1940 • 1942 • 1946(co) • 1967 • 1972 • 1973 • 1980(co) • 2013
Women's Tennis (13): 1982 • 1983 • 1984 • 1987 • 1988 • 1989 • 1990 • 1991 • 1992 • 1993 • 1994 • 1995 • 1998
Men's Outdoor Track & Field (12): 1936 • 1941 • 1950 • 1957 • 1970 • 1971 • 1973 • 1974 • 1979 • 1985 • 1990 • 1991
Wrestling (12): 1914 • 1921 • 1924(co) • 1925(co) • 1931 • 1932(co) • 1933 • 1934 • 1936 • 1939 • 1940 • 1943
Men's Golf (8): 1962 • 1968 • 1970 • 1973 • 1974 • 1975 • 1991 • 1998
Women's Golf (7): 1986 • 1987 • 1990 • 1992 • 1995 • 1996 • 1998
Baseball (7): 1925 • 1932 • 1938(co) • 1949(co) • 2013 • 2014 • 2019
Women's Swimming & Diving (6): 2003 • 2007 • 2009 • 2010 • 2011 • 2019
Men's Tennis (5): 1921 • 1952 • 1953 • 1954 • 1964 
Softball (3): 1983 • 1986 • 1994
Women's Indoor Track & Field (3): 1988 • 1991 • 2000 
Football (2): 1945 • 1967(co)
Women's Cross Country (2): 1989 • 1990
Women's Outdoor Track & Field (2): 2000 • 2001
Women's Basketball (2): 1983(co) • 2023
Women's Soccer (1): 1996

Big Ten tournament championships

Indiana University has 21 Big Ten tournament championships.

Men's Soccer (15): 1991 • 1992 • 1994 • 1995 (co) • 1996 • 1997 • 1998 • 1999 • 2001 • 2003 • 2006 • 2013 • 2018 • 2019 • 2021 
Baseball (4): 1996 • 2009 • 2013 • 2014
Women's Basketball (1): 2002
Women's Soccer (1): 1996

Other championships 

Collegiate Water Polo Association Championships (3)
Water Polo (3): • 2003 • 2011 • 2014

Notable alumni and former athletes

Baseball

Micah Johnson, MLB player: Chicago White Sox, Los Angeles Dodgers, Atlanta Braves
Kyle Schwarber, 4th overall pick by Chicago Cubs in 2014 Major League Baseball draft, 2013 and 2014 College Baseball All-America Team selections 
Sam Travis, 2nd round pick by Boston Red Sox in 2014 Major League Baseball draft
Ernie Andres, MLB player: Boston Red Sox
Ralph Brickner, MLB player: Boston Red Sox
Ted Kluszewski, MLB player: Cincinnati Reds, Pittsburgh Pirates, Chicago White Sox, Los Angeles Angels
Mickey Morandini, MLB player: Philadelphia Phillies, Chicago Cubs
Kevin Orie, MLB player: Chicago Cubs, Florida Marlins
Mike Simon, MLB player: Pittsburgh Pirates, St. Louis Terriers, Brooklyn Tip-Tops
John Wehner, MLB player: Pittsburgh Pirates
Kevin Mahar, MLB player: Texas Rangers
Josh Phegley, MLB player: Chicago White Sox, Oakland Athletics
Evan Crawford, MLB player: San Francisco Giants
Jake Dunning, MLB player: San Francisco Giants

Basketball

Steve Alford, Big Ten MVP, 1987; former University of New Mexico and University of California, Los Angeles men's basketball head coach, currently head coach of the University of Nevada, Olympic Gold Medalist
Eric Anderson, Big Ten Freshman of the Year, 1989
OG Anunoby, 2017; NBA Champion, NBA player, Toronto Raptors
Damon Bailey, Third team All-American, 1994
Armon Bassett - basketball player with Ironi Ramat Gan of Israel
Walt Bellamy, Basketball Hall of Fame, 1960 Olympic Gold Medalist, NBA 1st overall pick and Rookie of the Year
Kent Benson, Final Four MVP, 1976; NBA player: Milwaukee Bucks, Detroit Pistons, Utah Jazz, Cleveland Cavaliers
Kevin "Yogi" Ferrell, NBA player: Brooklyn Nets, Dallas Mavericks
Troy Williams, NBA player: Memphis Grizzlies, Houston Rockets
Quinn Buckner (current Indiana Pacers TV Analyst); 1976 National Champion, NBA Champion, Olympic Gold Medalist 
Calbert Cheaney, Big Ten MVP, 1993; National Player of the Year, 1993; NBA player: Washington Bullets/Wizards, Boston Celtics, Utah Jazz, Golden State Warriors
Everett Dean, head baseball and basketball coach at Indiana University
Archie Dees, Big Ten MVP, 1958, 1959
Steve Downing, Big Ten MVP, 1973
Jay Edwards, Big Ten Freshman of the Year, 1988; first team All-American, 1989
Brian Evans, Big Ten MVP, 1996; third team All-American, 1996
Dane Fife, Michigan State University men's assistant basketball coach
Lawrence Frank, NBA Head Coach: Detroit Pistons
Bill Garrett (William Leon Garrett), first African-American player in the Big Ten
Dean Garrett, Big Ten Newcomer of the Year, 1987
Eric Gordon, Big Ten Freshman of the Year, 2008; NBA player: Los Angeles Clippers, New Orleans Hornets, Houston Rockets
Greg Graham, IU guard, 1989–93; former Continental Basketball Association head coach
A.J. Guyton, Big Ten MVP, 2000; NBA player: Chicago Bulls, Golden State Warriors
Kirk Haston, NBA player; third team All-American, 2001
Alan Henderson, NBA player: Atlanta Hawks, Dallas Mavericks, Cleveland Cavaliers, Philadelphia 76ers
Marvin Huffman, Final Four MVP, 1940
Jared Jeffries, Big Ten MVP, 2002; NBA player: Washington Wizards, New York Knicks, Portland Trail Blazers
Ted Kitchel, Third team All-American, 1982
Bobby Leonard, Basketball Hall of Fame, Second team All-American 1954, coached Indiana Pacers to 3 ABA championships
Scott May, Big Ten MVP, 1975, 1976; NBA player: Chicago Bulls, Milwaukee Bucks, Detroit Pistons
Branch McCracken, coach
George McGinnis, Basketball Hall of Fame, 1975 ABA MVP, 3x NBA all-star, college third team All-American, 1971
Victor Oladipo, consensus first-team All-American, 2013; NBA player, Orlando Magic, Oklahoma City Thunder, Indiana Pacers
Don Schlundt, Big Ten MVP, 1953
Keith Smart, Final Four MVP,1987; NBA Head Coach: Golden State Warriors, Sacramento Kings
Isiah Thomas, Final Four MVP, 1981; Hall of Fame, NBA player: Detroit Pistons, NBA Head Coach: Indiana Pacers, New York Knicks, NBA General Manager: New York Knicks
Ray Tolbert, Big Ten MVP, 1981
Tara VanDerveer, Stanford University and 1996 U.S. Olympic women's basketball coach; Naismith and Women's Basketball Halls of Fame
D. J. White, First Team All Big Ten, 2008, Big Ten Player of the Year, 2008, Big Ten Freshmen of the Year, 2005, Freshmen All-American, 2005; NBA player: Charlotte Bobcats, Boston Celtics
Randy Wittman, Big Ten MVP, 1983; NBA player and Head Coach: Minnesota Timberwolves
Mike Woodson, Big Ten MVP, 1980; NBA player and Head Coach: Atlanta Hawks, New York Knicks
Bracey Wright, NBA player: Minnesota Timberwolves, Israeli Basketball Premier League
Cody Zeller, consensus second-team All-American, 2013; NBA player, Charlotte Bobcats/Hornets

Football

Tevin Coleman, NFL player: Atlanta Falcons
Jordan Howard, NFL player: Philadelphia Eagles
Victor Adeyanju, NFL player: St. Louis Rams
Carl Barzilauskas, NFL player: New York Jets, Green Bay Packers
Nate Borden, NFL player: Dallas Cowboys, Buffalo Bills
Cam Cameron, IU head coach, NFL Head Coach: Miami Dolphins, Current Offensive Coordinator: Baltimore Ravens
John Cannady, NFL Pro Bowl player: New York Giants
Z.G. Clevenger, member of College Football Hall of Fame
Kris Dielman, NFL player: San Diego Chargers
Vaughn Dunbar, First team All-American, 1991; NFL player: New Orleans Saints, Jacksonville Jaguars
Frank Filchock, NFL Pro Bowl player
Marcus Floyd, NFL player: New York Jets, Buffalo Bills, Carolina Panthers
Trent Green, NFL player: San Diego Chargers, Washington Redskins, St. Louis Rams, Kansas City Chiefs, Miami Dolphins; CFL player: BC Lions
Aaron Halterman, NFL player: Houston Texans
James Hardy, NFL player: Buffalo Bills
Gibran Hamdan, NFL player: Miami Dolphins
Robert Hoernschemeyer, NFL Pro Bowl player: 
Ben Ishola, NFL player: Miami Dolphins
Chick Jagade, NFL Pro Bowl player
Ken Johnson, NFL player: Cincinnati Bengals
Herana-Daze Jones, NFL player: Cincinnati Bengals, Denver Broncos, New England Patriots
Cody Latimer, NFL player: Denver Broncos
Babe Laufenberg, NFL player: New Orleans Saints, San Diego Chargers, Dallas Cowboys
Chris Liwienski, NFL player: Minnesota Vikings, Arizona Cardinals, Miami Dolphins
Adewale Ogunleye, NFL player: Chicago Bears
Pete Pihos, NFL player: Pro Football Hall of Fame
Tracy Porter, NFL player: New Orleans Saints, Denver Broncos, Oakland Raiders, Washington Redskins, Chicago Bears
Antwaan Randle El, NFL player: Pittsburgh Steelers, Washington Redskins
Courtney Roby, NFL player: New Orleans Saints
Eddie Rucinski, NFL Pro Bowl player
Lou Saban, AFL coach
Bob Skoronski, NFL Pro Bowl player: Green Bay Packers
Rob Spicer, NFL player: N.Y. Jets
Pete Stoyanovich, NFL player: Miami Dolphins, Kansas City Chiefs, St. Louis Rams
George Taliaferro, AAFC and NFL player, first African-American selected in the NFL Draft
Anthony Thompson, Heisman Trophy finalist. NFL player: Phoenix Cardinals
Willie Townes, NFL player: Dallas Cowboys
Dave Whitsell, NFL Pro Bowl player
Sam Wyche, NFL player and coach: Cincinnati Bengals

Golf
Randy Leen, low amateur, 1996 U.S. Open
Brad Marek, club pro, made cut at 2021 PGA Championship
Jeff Overton, PGA Tour player, member of 2010 USA Ryder Cup team
Shaun Micheel, PGA Tour player, winner of the 2003 PGA Championship

Mixed Martial Arts
Julie Kedzie, Two-time Hook n' Shoot Tournament Champion, National Karate Champion & fought in first women's MMA match on cable television
Chris Lytle (Sports Management), retired mixed martial artist

Soccer

Eric Alexander, MLS player: Portland Timbers
Kevin Alston, MLS player: New England Revolution
Mike Ambersley, NASL player: Tampa Bay Rowdies
Armando Betancourt, European professional player: RC Strasbourg; Honduras National Team
Mike Clark, MLS player: Columbus Crew
Angelo DiBernardo, NASL player: New York Cosmos, Los Angeles Aztecs; US Men's National Team
Wendy Dillinger (WUSA)
Nick Garcia, MLS player: Kansas City Wizards, San Jose Earthquakes; US Men's National Team
Ned Grabavoy, MLS player: Los Angeles Galaxy, Columbus Crew, San Jose Earthquakes Real Salt Lake
Tracy Grose (WUSA)
Chris Klein, MLS player: Kansas City Wizards, Real Salt Lake, Los Angeles Galaxy; US Men's National Team
Aleksey Korol, MLS player: Dallas Burn, Chicago Fire
Dema Kovalenko, MLS player: Chicago Fire, D.C. United, New York Red Bulls, Real Salt Lake, Los Angeles Galaxy
Yuri Lavrinenko, MLS player: Chicago Fire
Ryan Mack
Brian Maisonneuve, MLS player: Columbus Crew; US Men's National Team
Robert Meschbach
Drew Moor, MLS player: FC Dallas; US Men's National Team
Lee Nguyen, MLS player: New England Revolution
Jay Nolly, MLS player: Real Salt Lake, D.C. United
Pat Noonan, MLS player: New England Revolution; US Men's National Team
Danny O'Rourke, Hermann Trophy winner; MLS player: San Jose Earthquakes, New York Red Bulls, Columbus Crew
Brian Plotkin, MLS player: Chicago Fire
Jacob Peterson, MLS player: Colorado Rapids
Matt Reiswerg, Cincinnati Riverhawks, Indiana Blast, 2005 Maccabiah Games
Ken Snow, Two-time Hermann Trophy winner; US Men's National Team
Juergen Sommer, Premier League player: Queens Park Rangers; US Men's National Team
Kelly Wilson (USA)
Todd Yeagley, MLS player: Columbus Crew
Jed Zayner, MLS player: Columbus Crew
Will Bruin, MLS player: Houston Dynamo

Swimming and Diving

Mark Spitz, 1968 and 1972 Olympic gold medalist swimmer—1971 Sullivan Award
Lilly King, 2016 Olympic gold medalist
Cody Miller, 2016 Olympic gold medalist
Fred Tyler, 1972 Olympic gold medalist swimmer
John Kinsella, 1968 silver and 1972 Olympic gold medalist swimmer—Sullivan Award winner 1970
Gary Hall, Sr., 1968, 1972 and 1976 Olympic medalist swimmer
Lesley Bush, Olympic gold medalist diver
Jim Montgomery (1976 Olympics/3 Gold Medals 100 free, 2 relays )
John Murphy (1972 Olympian-gold medalist 400 free relay)
Charlie Hickcox (1968 Olympian 3 time gold medalist)
Larry Barbiere (1968 Olympian)
Mike Troy (1960 Olympian Gold Medalist)
Mike Stamm (1972 Olympian Gold  & Silver medalist)
Cynthia Potter, Olympian and inductee to International Swimming & Diving Hall of Fame
Mark Lenzi (1992 Olympian Gold Medalist)
Don McKenzie (1968 Olympian Gold Medalist)
Bob Windle (1964 Olympic gold medallist in the 1500 m freestyle for Australia)

Track and field
Greg Bell, long jumper
Milt Campbell, decathlete
Derek Drouin, high jumper (2013 winner of The Bowerman)
Bob Kennedy, long-distance runner
Don Lash, long-distance runner
Molly Ludlow, middle-distance runner
David Neville, 400 m runner
Rose Richmond, long jumper
Dave Volz, pole vaulter
Aarik Wilson, triple jumper

Wrestling
Roger Chandler - Wrestling team head coach at Michigan State University
Joe Dubuque, Two-time NCAA Wrestling champion.
Angel Escobedo, NCAA Wrestling Champion.
Dave Herman, 2006 NCAA qualifier; mixed martial artist formerly for the Ultimate Fighting Championship
Nathan Everhart, Three-time NCAA national qualifier; professional wrestler

Water Polo
Jessica Gaudreault - Starting goalkeeper of the Canadian Women's Senior National Team who earned a qualifying bid to the Tokyo Olympics.

References

External links

Stats and Scores from IU's 1976 Perfect Season